Paduka Sri Sultan Sulaiman Badr ul-‘Alam Shah Khalifat ul-Muminim ibni Almarhum Sultan ‘Abdu’l Jalil Ri’ayat Shah (11 November 1699 – 20 August 1760) was the 13th Sultan and Yang di-Pertuan Besar of Johor and Pahang and their dependencies who reigned from 1722 to 1760. He succeeded on the defeat of the putative claimant to Johor throne, Raja Kecil who reigned shortly in Johor from 1718–1722.

Early life
Known as Raja Sulaiman before his accession, he is the fifth son of the 10th Sultan of Johor, Abdul Jalil Shah IV, by his fourth wife, Che Nusamah. Appointed as Governor of Pahang, following the rebellion against his uncle, the Yang di-Pertuan Muda in 1712. Appointed later as Heir Apparent by his father with the title of Yang di-Pertuan Muda before December 28, 1715.

After the assassination of his father the Sultan in 1721, who was earlier deposed and demoted by Raja Kecil in 1718, Raja Sulaiman was taken captive by the Minangkabau forces together with his sister, Tengku Tengah. They were made servants of Raja Kecil, one to carry his kris, the other his betel box.

Reign
Raja Sulaiman was raised to the throne with the help of the Bugis princes after they had expelled Raja Kecil in 1722. He was crowned at Riau with title of Paduka Sri Sultan Sulaiman Badr ul-‘Alam Shah Khalifat ul-Muminim, on October 4, 1722. Sulaiman Shah had little real influence over the administration of his state. While the Bugis allowed to retain nominal supremacy, they introduced and maintained for themselves the office of Yamtuan Muda, in which real power was vested.

The Bugis influence was so dominant that the sultan even wrote to the Dutch governor of Malacca with a request to be rescued from them, but to no avail. Bugis dominance over Johor remained uncontested, at least for the next few decades.

The sultan was impressed with the military might of the Dutch and their help towards him against the Minang during the war against the Siak. In response, during his trip to Malacca on August 1755, he agreed to hand over monopoly rights over to the Dutch, tin-mining areas in Klang, Linggi and Selangor that were originally Bugis stronghold areas, understandably, this had the effect of angering the Bugis chiefs.

Sulaiman Shah died in Riau on August 20, 1760 and buried at Batangan, having had issue, seventeen sons and ten daughters. He was succeeded by his second son, Abdul Jalil Muazzam Shah.

References

Bibliography
 

1760 deaths
1699 births
Sultans of Johor
18th-century monarchs in Asia
House of Bendahara of Johor